Prionotalis balia is a moth in the family Crambidae. It was described by Tams in 1932. It is found in the Democratic Republic of Congo and Kenya.

References

Crambinae
Moths described in 1932
Moths of Africa